Zimnica or Zimnitsa may refer to:

 Zimnica (river) in Poland
Zimnica, Lower Silesian Voivodeship in Gmina Oleśnica, Oleśnica County in Lower Silesian Voivodeship (SW Poland)
 the Bulgarian villages of:
 Zimnitsa, Dobrich Province
 Zimnitsa, Stara Zagora Province
 Zimnitsa, Yambol Province